The albums discography of Roc Nation, an American company and record label, consists of three studio albums, one collaboration album, one compilation album and two mixtapes by Jay-Z, four studio albums and two mixtapes by J. Cole, one studio album by Alexis Jordan, one studio album by Hugo, one studio album by Rita Ora, and one studio album by Rihanna. Upcoming studio albums are also included.

Jay-Z

Studio albums

Collaboration albums

Compilation albums

Mixtapes

{| class="wikitable plainrowheaders" style="text-align:center;"
|+ List of studio albums, with selected chart positions, sales figures and certifications
! scope="col" rowspan="2" style="width:10em;"| Title
! scope="col" rowspan="2" style="width:18em;"| Album details
! scope="col" colspan="10"| Peak chart positions
! scope="col" rowspan="2" style="width:12em;"| Certifications
! scope="col" rowspan="2"| Sales
|-
! scope="col" style="width:3em;font-size:90%;"| US
! scope="col" style="width:3em;font-size:90%;"| US R&B
! scope="col" style="width:3em;font-size:90%;"| CAN
! scope="col" style="width:3em;font-size:90%;"| FRA
! scope="col" style="width:3em;font-size:90%;"| GER
! scope="col" style="width:3em;font-size:90%;"| NLD
! scope="col" style="width:3em;font-size:90%;"| NOR
! scope="col" style="width:3em;font-size:90%;"| SWE
! scope="col" style="width:3em;font-size:90%;"| SWI
! scope="col" style="width:3em;font-size:90%;"| UK
|-
! scope="row" | The Blueprint 3
|
 Release: September 8, 2009
 Label: Roc Nation
 Formats: CD, LP, digital download
| 1 || 1 || 1 || 20 || 22 || 12 || 15 || 44 || 12 || 4
|
 US: Platinum
 CAN: Platinum
 FRA: Gold
 IRE: Gold
 UK: Platinum
|
 US: 1,909,000
|-
! scope="row" | Magna Carta Holy Grail
|
 Release: July 4, 2013 (Samsung exclusive)July 9, 2013 (Official release)
 Label: Roc Nation, Roc-A-Fella, Universal
 Formats: CD, LP, cassette, digital download
| 1 || 1 || 1 || 12 || 9 || 7 || 2 || 8 || 1 || 1
|
 CAN: Platinum
 UK: Gold
 US: 2× Platinum
|
 US: 1,100,000
|-
! scope="row" | 4:44
|
 Release: June 20, 2017
 Label: Roc Nation
 Formats: CD, streaming, digital download
| 1 || 1 || 1 || || || || || || || 3
|
 US: Platinum
|
|-
|}

{| class="wikitable plainrowheaders" style="text-align:center;"
|+ List of collaboration albums, with selected chart positions and certifications
! scope="col" rowspan="2" style="width:10em;"| Title
! scope="col" rowspan="2" style="width:18em;"| Album details
! scope="col" colspan="10"| Peak chart positions
! scope="col" rowspan="2" style="width:12em;"| Certifications
|-
! scope="col" style="width:3em;font-size:90%;"| US
! scope="col" style="width:3em;font-size:90%;"| US R&B
! scope="col" style="width:3em;font-size:90%;"| CAN
! scope="col" style="width:3em;font-size:90%;"| FRA
! scope="col" style="width:3em;font-size:90%;"| GER
! scope="col" style="width:3em;font-size:90%;"| NLD
! scope="col" style="width:3em;font-size:90%;"| NOR
! scope="col" style="width:3em;font-size:90%;"| SWE
! scope="col" style="width:3em;font-size:90%;"| SWI
! scope="col" style="width:3em;font-size:90%;"| UK
|-
! scope="row" | Watch the Throne(with Kanye West)
|
 Released: August 8, 2011
 Label: Roc-A-Fella, Roc Nation, Def Jam
 Formats: CD, LP, digital download
| 1 || 1 || 1 || 10 || 2 || 3 || 1 || 27 || 1 || 3
|
 US: 5× Platinum
 CAN: Platinum
 UK: Platinum
 ARIA: Gold
|-
|}

{| class="wikitable plainrowheaders" style="text-align:center;"
|+ List of compilation albums, with selected chart positions and certifications
! scope="col" rowspan="2" style="width:10em;"| Title
! scope="col" rowspan="2" style="width:18em;"| Album details
! scope="col" colspan="6"| Peak chart positions
! scope="col" rowspan="2" style="width:12em;"| Certifications
|-
! scope="col" style="width:3em;font-size:90%;"| US
! scope="col" style="width:3em;font-size:90%;"| US R&B
! scope="col" style="width:3em;font-size:90%;"| GER
! scope="col" style="width:3em;font-size:90%;"| NOR
! scope="col" style="width:3em;font-size:90%;"| SWI
! scope="col" style="width:3em;font-size:90%;"| UK
|-
! scope="row" | The Hits Collection, Volume One
|
 Released: November 22, 2010
 Label: Roc Nation, Def Jam, Roc-A-Fella
 Formats: CD, LP, digital download
| 43 || 11 || 89 || 16 || 98 || 20
|
 UK: Silver
|-
|}

J. Cole

Studio albums

Mixtapes

{| class="wikitable plainrowheaders" style="text-align:center;"
|+ List of studio albums, with selected chart positions, sales figures and certifications
! scope="col" rowspan="2" style="width:10em;" | Title
! scope="col" rowspan="2" style="width:23em;" | Album details
! scope="col" colspan="6" | Peak chart positions
! scope="col" rowspan="2" style="width:12em;" | Certifications
|-
! scope="col" style="width:2.5em;font-size:90%;" | US
! scope="col" style="width:2.5em;font-size:90%;" | US R&B
! scope="col" style="width:2.5em;font-size:90%;" | US Rap
! scope="col" style="width:2.5em;font-size:90%;" | CAN
! scope="col" style="width:2.5em;font-size:90%;" | AUS
! scope="col" style="width:2.5em;font-size:90%;" | UK
|-
! scope="row" | Cole World: The Sideline Story
|
 Released: September 27, 2011
 Label: 
 Format: 
| 1 || 1 || 1 || 4 || 52 || 25
|
 US: Platinum
|-
! scope="row" | Born Sinner
|
 Released: June 18, 2013
 Label: 
 Format: 
| 1 || 1 || 1 || 2 || 14 || 7
|
 US: Platinum
|-
! scope="row"| 2014 Forest Hills Drive
|
 Released: December 9, 2014
 Label: 
 Formats: 
| 1 || 1 || 1 || 3 || 40 || 33
|
 US: 3× Platinum
|-
! scope="row"| 4 Your Eyez Only
|
 Released: December 9, 2016
 Label: 
 Formats: 
| 1 || 1 || 1 || 1 || 6 || 21
|
 US: Platinum
|-
! scope="row"| KOD
|
 Released: April 20, 2018
 Label: 
 Formats: 
| 1 || 1 || 1 || 1 || 1 || 2
|
 US: Platinum
|-
! scope="row"| The Off-Season
|
 Released: May 14, 2021
 Label: 
 Formats: 
| 1 || 1 || 1 || 1 || 3 || 2
|
 US:
|}

Alexis Jordan

Studio albums

{|class="wikitable plainrowheaders" style="text-align:center;" border="1"
|+ List of albums, with selected chart positions
! scope="col" rowspan="2" style="width:9em;"| Title
! scope="col" rowspan="2" style="width:16em;"| Album details
! scope="col" colspan="6" | Peak chart positions
|-
! scope="col" style="width:3em;font-size:85%"| AUS
! scope="col" style="width:3em;font-size:85%"| BEL (FLA)
! scope="col" style="width:3em;font-size:85%"| IRE
! scope="col" style="width:3em;font-size:85%"| NL
! scope="col" style="width:3em;font-size:85%"| SWI
! scope="col" style="width:3em;font-size:85%"| UK
|-
! scope="row" |Alexis Jordan
|
 Released: February 25, 2011
 Label: StarRoc, Roc Nation, Columbia
 Formats: CD, digital download
| 11 || 87 || 28 || 21 || 96 || 9
|-
|}

Hugo

Studio albums

{|class="wikitable plainrowheaders" style="text-align:center;" border="1"
|+ List of albums, with selected chart positions
! scope="col" rowspan="2" style="width:9em;"| Title
! scope="col" rowspan="2" style="width:16em;"| Album details
! scope="col" colspan="6" | Peak chart positions
|-
! scope="col" style="width:2.5em;font-size:90%;" | US
! scope="col" style="width:2.5em;font-size:90%;" | US R&B
! scope="col" style="width:2.5em;font-size:90%;" | CAN
! scope="col" style="width:2.5em;font-size:90%;" | AUS
! scope="col" style="width:2.5em;font-size:90%;" | UK
|-
! scope="row" |Old Tyme Religion
|
 Released: May 10, 2011
 Label: Roc Nation
 Formats: CD, digital download
| — || — || — || — || —
|-
|colspan="8" style="font-size:90%"| "—" denotes a release that did not chart or was not released in that territory.
|}

Rita Ora

Studio albums

{|class="wikitable plainrowheaders" style="text-align:center;" border="1"
|+ List of albums, with selected chart positions
! scope="col" rowspan="2" style="width:11em;" | Title
! scope="col" rowspan="2" style="width:16em;" | Album details
! scope="col" colspan="8" | Peak chart positions
|-
! scope="col" style="width:3em;font-size:90%;" | UK
! scope="col" style="width:3em;font-size:90%;" | AUS
! scope="col" style="width:3em;font-size:90%;" | AUT
! scope="col" style="width:3em;font-size:90%;" | BEL(FL)
! scope="col" style="width:3em;font-size:90%;" | GER
! scope="col" style="width:3em;font-size:90%;" | IRL
! scope="col" style="width:3em;font-size:90%;"| NZ
! scope="col" style="width:3em;font-size:90%;" | SWI
|-
! scope="row" | Ora
|
 Released: 27 August 2012
 Label: Roc Nation, Columbia
 Formats: CD, digital download
| 1 || 24 || 51 || 101 || 63 || 2 || 24 || 15
|}

Rihanna

Studio albums

{| class="wikitable plainrowheaders" style="text-align:center;"
|+ List of studio albums, with selected chart positions, sales figures and certifications
! scope="col" rowspan="2" style="width:10em;"| Title
! scope="col" rowspan="2" style="width:18em;"| Album details
! scope="col" colspan="4"| Peak chart positions
! scope="col" rowspan="2" style="width:12em;"| Certifications
! scope="col" rowspan="2"| Sales
|-
! scope="col" style="width:2.5em;font-size:90%;" | US
! scope="col" style="width:2.5em;font-size:90%;" | US R&B
! scope="col" style="width:2.5em;font-size:90%;" | CAN
! scope="col" style="width:2.5em;font-size:90%;" | UK
|-
! scope="row" |Anti
|
 Released: January 28, 2016
 Label: Westbury Road, Roc Nation
 Formats: CD, digital download
| 1 || 1 || 1 || 7
|
 US: 4× Platinum
|
 US: 700,000
|-
|}

See also
 Roc Nation singles discography

References and notes

External links
 Official website – RocNation.com

Discographies of American record labels
Hip hop discographies
Electronic music discographies
Albums discography